A dolmen is a type of megalithic tomb, common in Europe.

Dolmen may also refer to:

 Dolmen (miniseries), a 2005 French TV miniseries
 Dolmen (typeface), a 1923 typeface, designed by Max Salzmann for the Schelter & Giesecke Type Foundry
 Dolmen (video game), a 2022 video game
 The Dolmen, a UK band

See also 
 
 Dolman, an article of clothing